The Invisible Touch Tour was a worldwide concert tour by the English rock band Genesis. The tour began on 18 September 1986 in Detroit and ended on 4 July 1987 in London. London dates at Wembley Stadium were filmed for a video release entitled Genesis Live at Wembley Stadium. The group earned as much as $300,000 a night in North America alone. The five shows in East Rutherford, New Jersey, Philadelphia, and Washington, D.C. in May 1987 grossed $5.4 million and were attended by a total of 273,414 people.

Setlist
Whilst the setlist varied, this is a representation of the average setlist from this tour.

"Mama"
"Abacab"
"Land of Confusion"
"That's All"
"Domino"
"Your Own Special Way" (performed in Australia only with a string section)
"In Too Deep" (eliminated after December 20, 1986)
"The Brazilian"
"Follow You Follow Me" (eliminated after December 13, 1986)
"Tonight, Tonight, Tonight"
"Home by the Sea"
"Second Home by the Sea"
"Throwing It All Away"
"In the Cage"
"...In That Quiet Earth"
"Supper's Ready" (replaced by "Afterglow" after November 23, 1986)VI. "Apocalypse in 9/8 (Co-Starring the Delicious Talents of Gabble Ratchet)"VII. "As Sure As Eggs Is Eggs (Aching Men's Feet)"
"Invisible Touch"
"Drum Duet"
"Los Endos"
"Turn It On Again"

Every song from Invisible Touch was performed throughout the tour except for "Anything She Does"; however the song's promotional video was used to introduce the band at the beginning of each show from 10 May onwards. On the Australian leg, "Your Own Special Way" was performed for the first time since 1977. The 1987 U.S. and European legs of the tour saw the "Supper's Ready" section of the "In the Cage" medley dropped in favour of "Afterglow"*+. "In Too Deep" and "Follow You Follow Me" were dropped from set.

New songs "Throwing It All Away", and "Land of Confusion" contained several high notes that were vocally challenging for Collins to perform every night. To prevent potential damage to his voice, the songs were performed in a lower key from their original studio recordings as a safety measure after the initial North American leg of the tour. To this end however, the song "Invisible Touch" was placed in the set directly after the vocal stretching "Apocalypse in 9/8" (dropped for this very reason) and was never performed live in its original key of F on this or any tour thereafter. Mama was initially played in its entirety on the initial North American leg but the last verse was dropped thereafter, perhaps to shorten it and/or save Phil's voice a bit. The last verse was never played again on subsequent tours. 
The instrumental B-side track "Do the neurotic" was rehearsed (with Collins on drums) and sound-checked but never made it into the actual setlist.

Tour band
Phil Collins – lead vocals, drums, electronic percussion, percussion
Tony Banks – keyboards, moog taurus
Mike Rutherford – guitar, bass+, bass pedals, backing vocals

Additional Musicians
Daryl Stuermer – bass, guitar*, backing vocals
Chester Thompson – drums, electronic percussion

Tour dates

References

External links 
genesis-movement.org 

Genesis (band) concert tours
1986 concert tours
1987 concert tours